The Siren is a 1917 American silent Western film directed by Roland West, in one of his earlier efforts, and starred Valeska Surratt. The Siren is now considered lost.

Cast
 Valeska Suratt as Cherry Millard
 Clifford Bruce as Derrick McClade
 Robert Clugston as Burt Hall
 Isabel Rea as Rose Langdon
 Cesare Gravina as Her Father
 Armand Kalisz as Armand
 Rica Scott as Cherry's Maid
 Curtis Benton

See also
 List of lost silent films (1915–19)

References

External links
 
 

1917 films
1917 Western (genre) films
Fox Film films
American black-and-white films
Films directed by Roland West
Lost Western (genre) films
Lost American films
1917 lost films
Silent American Western (genre) films
1910s American films
1910s English-language films